Toe jam may refer to:

Places
 Toe Jam Hill on Bainbridge Island, Washington, United States

Arts, entertainment, and media

Music
 "Toe Jam" (song), a 2008 song by The Brighton Port Authority
 “Toe Jam”, a 1969 song by Canadian band Edward Bear
 “Toe Jam”, a 1969 song by American rock band Mount Rushmore
 “Toe Jam”, a track on the 1977 album Riding High by Faze-O
 “Toe Jam”, a song on the 1988 album Pound for Pound by Canadian band Anvil
 “Toe Jam”, a song on the 2001 album Bedrock 3 by American jazz musician Uri Caine
 "Toe Jam",  a track by Quincy Jones and Bill Cosby on the 2004 album The Original Jam Sessions 1969
 “Toe Jam”, an original song in the 2004 video game Dance Dance Revolution Ultramix 2
 Toe Jam, a 2012 EP by Australian musician Joe Robinson
 “The Toe Jam”, a track on the 1983 EP Buzz or Howl Under the Influence of Heat by American band Minutemen
 Toe Jam Band, the musical group accompanying guitarist Tony Meléndez

Other uses in arts, entertainment, and media
 Toe Jam Puppet Band, an American children's entertainment group
 ToeJam, a fictional character from the videogame ToeJam & Earl
 ToeJam & Earl, 1991 videogame
 ToeJam & Earl in Panic on Funkotron, 1993 videogame
 ToeJam & Earl III: Mission to Earth, 2002 videogame
 ToeJam & Earl: Back in the Groove, 2019 videogame